Angelo Pizzi (1775 – Venice, 1819) was an Italian sculptor, active in a Neoclassical style.

He was  pupil of Giuseppe Franchi. He completed the statues of Saints Matthew and Simon for the Duomo of Milan. He made a model for a colossal statue of Napoleon, held at the Brera Academy. He became a professor of sculpture in Carrara, and then in 1807 moved to Venice, and was a professor at the Accademia di Belle Arti di Venezia.

References

18th-century Italian sculptors
Italian male sculptors
19th-century Italian sculptors
1775 births
1819 deaths
Academic staff of the Accademia di Belle Arti di Venezia
19th-century Italian male artists
18th-century Italian male artists